M-21 highway is a Montenegrin roadway. It runs concurrently with European route E763.

History
Because the M-21 highway flowed through the heart of the city of Bijelo Polje, it caused heavy traffic delays. As a means to alleviate traffic in the city, the Montenegrin Ministry of Transport and Maritime Affairs commissioned a project to create a bypass around the city. As a result, on 27 March 2014, the Ministry of Transport and Maritime Affairs officially realigned the M-21 highway to its current alignment. The M-21 highway would now run along the bypass, no longer running through the city.

Major intersections

References

M21